Gustavus Airport  is a state-owned public-use airport located in Gustavus, a city in the Hoonah-Angoon Census Area of the U.S. state of Alaska. Scheduled airline service is subsidized by the Essential Air Service program.

As per Federal Aviation Administration records, the airport had 11,828 passenger boardings (enplanements) in calendar year 2008, 8,822 enplanements in 2009, and 9,996 in 2010. It is included in the National Plan of Integrated Airport Systems for 2015–2019, which categorized it as a nonprimary commercial service airport based on 9,509 enplanements in 2014.

Facilities and aircraft
Gustavus Airport covers an area of 1,821 acres (737 ha) at an elevation of 35 feet (11 m) above mean sea level. It has two asphalt paved runways: 11/29 is 6,721 by 150 feet (2,049 x 46 m) and 2/20 is 3,146 by 60 feet (959 x 18 m).

For the 12-month period ending May 30, 2010, the airport had 5,750 aircraft operations, an average of 15 per day: 57% air taxi, 38% general aviation, 4% scheduled commercial, and 1% military. At that time there were 21 aircraft based at this airport: 86% single-engine, 9% multi-engine, and 5% helicopter.

Fuel and FBO services
Aviation fuel (only Jet A, no AVGAS) is available 24/7 on the airport from Avfuel provider Gustavus Dray, Inc., serving private, corporate and military aircraft. FBO services also include ramp escort and aircraft lavatory service.

There are no landing or tie down fees. There is no charge for transient aircraft parking. There are four concrete hard-stands for larger jet aircraft over 12,500 lbs.

Airlines and destinations

Jet service is operated on a seasonal basis by Alaska Airlines with Boeing 737 aircraft.

Statistics

Top destinations

References

Other sources

 Essential Air Service documents (Docket OST-1998-4899) from the U.S. Department of Transportation:
 Order 2004-5-5 (May 4, 2004): tentatively reselects Alaska Airlines, Inc., to provide subsidized essential air service at Cordova, Gustavus, Petersburg, Wrangell, and Yakutat (southeast) Alaska, for the period from October 1, 2003, through April 30, 2006, at an annual rate of $5,723,008.
 Order 2006-3-20 (March 22, 2006): re-selecting Alaska Airlines, Inc., to provide subsidized essential air service at Cordova, Gustavus, Petersburg, Wrangell, and Yakutat (southeast) Alaska, for the period from May 1, 2006, through April 30, 2009.
 Order 2009-2-3 (February 9, 2009): re-selecting Alaska Airlines, Inc., to provide essential air service (EAS) at Cordova, Gustavus, and Yakutat, for an annual subsidy rate of $5,793,201 and at Petersburg and Wrangell at an annual subsidy rate of $1,347,195, through April 30, 2011.
 Order 2011-2-1 (February 1, 2011): re-selecting Alaska Airlines, Inc., to provide essential air service (EAS) at Cordova, Gustavus, and Yakutat, for an annual subsidy rate of $4,486,951 and at Petersburg and Wrangell at an annual subsidy rate of $3,415,987, from May 1, 2011, through April 30, 2013.
 Order 2013-2-10 (February 11, 2013): re-selecting Alaska Airlines, Inc., to provide Essential Air Service (EAS) at Cordova, Gustavus, and Yakutat, Alaska, for $4,827,052 annual subsidy and at Petersburg and Wrangell at an annual subsidy rate of $3,476,579, from May 1, 2013, through April 30, 2015.

External links
 Topographic map from USGS The National Map
 FAA Alaska airport diagram (GIF)
 

Airports in the Hoonah–Angoon Census Area, Alaska
Essential Air Service